The Oxford University Tape Recording Society (OUTRS) was a student's club of recording enthusiasts that has existed from at least 1966 until at least 1976. Among its members were AES fellow Michael Gerzon and Peter Craven, co-inventors of the Soundfield microphone, Nimbus Records director Jonathan Halliday and sound engineer and prolific Ambisonic recordist Paul Hodges (father of pianist Nicolas Hodges).

The OUTRS' recordings have been quoted in early listening experiments on four-speaker stereo reproduction. Subsequently, the society conducted some ground-breaking experiments in full-sphere surround recording, laying the foundation for the development of the Ambisonic surround sound system.

External links 
 The tape collection of Michael Gerzon contains many OUTRS recordings and is available at The British Library Catalogue No. C236.
 A short documentary focusing on Michael Gerzon and the work of the OUTRS, including interviews with Peter Craven and Paul Hodges can be seen here: https://www.youtube.com/watch?v=X23hZNoSkUs

References 

Ambisonics